A list of settlements in Hungary whose name was changed during the 19-20th century. This list contains only settlements within the present-day borders of Hungary.

Uncategorised 
 Fünfkirchen → Pécs
 Gran → Esztergom
 Ödenburg → Sopron
 Waitzen → Vác

Places
Hungary
Hungary
Names of places in Hungary